William Rosewell may refer to:

 William Rosewell (Solicitor-General) (c. 1520–1566), Solicitor-General to Queen Elizabeth
 William Rosewell (gentleman) (c. 1500–1570), gentleman and landholder of Loxton, Somerset
 William Rosewell (apothecary) (c. 1606–c. 1680), London apothecary and Royalist soldier